Condica begallo is a species of moth in the family Noctuidae (the owlet moths). It was first described by William Barnes in 1905 and it is found in North America.

The MONA or Hodges number for Condica begallo is 9709.

References

Further reading

 
 
 

Condicinae
Articles created by Qbugbot
Moths described in 1905